February Revolution in Paraguay was a military coup d’état on February 17, 1936 that brought to power colonel Rafael Franco. The Revolution marked the end of Liberal Party rule in Paraguay and started the ascendancy of military dictatorships that lasted for more than half a century.

Franco's government rapidly carried out many reforms, one of which was "land reform" (the confiscation, and breaking up, of some large private land holdings). Franco was overthrown on August 13, 1937, but his influence and that of febreristas continued to influence Paraguayan politics and eventually led to the Paraguayan Civil war of 1947 and establishment of Revolutionary Febrerista Party in 1951.

The revolution has been described as a "joint Marxist and fascist coup" which "laid the groundwork for the pro-Nazi dictatorship of Higinio Morínigo in 1940".

Background
The main idea behind the Revolution can be summoned with a fragment from a play by Julio Correa about the war: "After this war…we will embrace the tricolor, in this war we have demonstrated who we are…,that we are strong in the face of wrong, that we have strength and heart. We are going to expel all the Bolivians and later we will expel all of the traitors and thieves. Our country is ours…,we won it with sweat, tears and blood. All the Paraguayans after this war will have a piece of land on which to build their homes."

After armistice was signed on June 12, 1935 President Eusebio Ayala quickly dismissed many soldiers from the army and due to the economic recession they were left unemployed, many of them staying in Asuncion in search of better opportunities. These Chaco War veterans and officers, dissatisfied with the weak Liberal politician leadership during the war and treatment of demobilized soldiers, who were sent home without pensions, found a leader in a populist officer, colonel Rafael Franco. He was a political and military troublemaker who by this time had been appointed the head the Military College and the National War Veteran's Association with more than 100 000 members.

By the end of Chaco War, the term of President  Ayala was ending and he supported the popular commander of Paraguayan forces in Chaco, José Félix Estigarribia as a possible candidate. There were also suspicions that Ayola with the help of Estigarribia might want to extend his rule for another term. Estigarribia also had opponents within the military, who were dissatisfied with his leadership during the war.

Worried about the rise Estigarribia, colonel Franco started a campaign against him, accusing him of military mistakes and failing to capture Santa Cruz de la Sierra. On February 6, 1936 Franco was arrested and exiled to Buenos Aires for plotting against the government. This raised his supporters to action.

During the night of February 16 troops led by lieutenant colonels Federico Wenman Smith and Camildo Recalde occupied Asunción. Police headquarters were attacked with a loss of about 50 lives. Battles in the city lasted the whole day and in the evening President Ayala surrendered to Recalde. Estigarribia flew to Asuncion from his headquarters in Chaco, but was arrested in the airport. Franco returned victorious to the capital on February 19 and assumed Presidency.

Main achievements
Franco's supporters came from those who hated the rule of Liberal politicians and the large landowners – war veterans, students and peasants, uniting all kinds of political persuasions, from socialism to nationalism. Franco insisted that his revolution is one of national solidarity aimed at increasing the well-being of regular people. On 15 November 1936 a new Unión Nacional Revolucionaria was established which was meant to unite all supporters of the revolution, but it failed.

February Revolution succeeded in three areas:
it replaced Liberalism with military nationalism. Franco raised Francisco Solano López, whom Liberals had strongly criticized for bringing Paraguay to destruction, to the status of national hero. His remains were discovered and together with those of his father Carlos Antonio López buried in the National Pantheon of the Heroes. 
it launched the first serious land reform. By Franco's fall nearly  had been distributed to 10 000 farmers. 
it officially recognized worker's rights. In June 1936 the Ministry of Labor was created and the first ever Labor Code adopted. Eight-hour working day, paid vacations, weekends, right to strike and labor unions all were introduced. The Confederation of Paraguayan Workers was established.

Another result of the Revolution was beginning of the official use of the native Guarani language. Guarani was widely spoken among the soldiers and was used per order of José Félix Estigarribia in Paraguayan military communications during the Chaco War in order to make them harder for Bolivians to decode.

Reasons for failure
Franco's government defined itself as being opposed to the previous Liberal era, but it lacked a unified vision for what it stood for and what it wanted to achieve.

To pacify the revolutionary strikes, land seizures and unrest in army, on March 10, 1936 Franco issued Decree 152 by which he forbade all political parties and proclaimed that February revolution will follow the totalitarian regimes of Europe. This March 10, 1936 law was drafted by the Minister of Interior Gomes Freire Esteves, who was a fascist sympathizer and in 1915 had led a revolt against President Eduardo Schaerer. The law proposed to establish a corporativist state. This alienated many of Franco's supporters. The uproar among Franco's political supporters was so great that he was forced to null this decree. Political ineptitude of Franco led to the withdrawal of Colorado Party form his government.

Meanwhile, the Chaco Peace Conference was continuing and in January 1937 Franco agreed to give in to some Bolivian territorial demands. This caused dissatisfaction in the army and the commander of troops in Chaco, colonel Ramon Paredes who was a Liberal supporter. On August 13, 1937 his soldiers occupied Asuncion and overthrew Franco. Two years later Liberal politicians succeeded in electing Estigarribia to the Presidency of Republic.

References

For an overview of the revolution and the new government's activities during its brief period of power, see Paul H. Lewis' The Politics of Exile, Paraguay's Febrerista Party (University of North Carolina Press, 1968). The section on The Overthrow of the Liberal Government on pages 37-40 and The Febrerista Revolution, the new government, found on pages 40-63.

History of Paraguay
February 1936 events
Military coups in Paraguay
1936 in Paraguay
1936 in military history
1930s coups d'état and coup attempts